Liberty Baptist Church at Fifth & Christina Sts. in Kief, North Dakota was built in 1902.  It included Late Gothic Revival architecture.

The church was the first "Stundist" church built in North America. It has a hipped roof that is similar in design to the roofs of pioneer homes built by Ukrainian immigrants to the upper Great Plains.

The building was moved in 1936 to its current location. It was listed on the National Register of Historic Places in 1987.

References

Churches on the National Register of Historic Places in North Dakota
Gothic Revival church buildings in North Dakota
Churches completed in 1902
Baptist churches in North Dakota
Ukrainian-American culture in North Dakota
National Register of Historic Places in McHenry County, North Dakota
Relocated buildings and structures in North Dakota
1902 establishments in North Dakota